The 1997 Pepsi 400 was the 16th stock car race of the 1997 NASCAR Winston Cup Series and the 29th iteration of the event. The race was held on Saturday, July 5, 1997, in Daytona Beach, Florida at Daytona International Speedway, a 2.5 miles (4.0 km) permanent triangular-shaped superspeedway. The race took the scheduled 160 laps to complete. In a one-lap restart to the finish, Cale Yarborough Motorsports driver John Andretti would manage to defend the field in a close finish to take his first career NASCAR Winston Cup Series victory and his only victory of the season. To fill out the top three, Hendrick Motorsports driver Terry Labonte and Morgan–McClure Motorsports driver Sterling Marlin would finish second and third, respectively.

Background 

Daytona International Speedway is one of three superspeedways to hold NASCAR races, the other two being Indianapolis Motor Speedway and Talladega Superspeedway. The standard track at Daytona International Speedway is a four-turn superspeedway that is 2.5 miles (4.0 km) long. The track's turns are banked at 31 degrees, while the front stretch, the location of the finish line, is banked at 18 degrees.

Entry list 

 (R) denotes rookie driver.

Qualifying 
Qualifying was split into two rounds. The first round was held on Thursday, July 3, at 3:00 PM EST. Each driver would have one lap to set a time. During the first round, the top 25 drivers in the round would be guaranteed a starting spot in the race. If a driver was not able to guarantee a spot in the first round, they had the option to scrub their time from the first round and try and run a faster lap time in a second round qualifying run, held on Friday, July 4. As with the first round, each driver would have one lap to set a time. Positions 26-38 would be decided on time, and depending on who needed it, the 39th thru either the 42nd, 43rd, or 44th position would be based on provisionals. Four spots are awarded by the use of provisionals based on owner's points. The fifth is awarded to a past champion who has not otherwise qualified for the race. If no past champion needs the provisional, the field would be limited to 42 cars. If a champion needed it, the field would expand to 43 cars. If the race was a companion race with the NASCAR Winston West Series, four spots would be determined by NASCAR Winston Cup Series provisionals, while the final two spots would be given to teams in the Winston West Series, leaving the field at 44 cars.

Three drivers would fail to qualify: Loy Allen Jr., Geoff Bodine, and Jeff Green.

Full qualifying results

Race results

References 

1997 NASCAR Winston Cup Series
NASCAR races at Daytona International Speedway
July 1997 sports events in the United States
1997 in sports in Florida